Alone in the Dark Wood is the sixth major studio release by Fursaxa.

Track listing
"Intro" – 0:16
"Lunaria Enters the Blue Lodge" – 3:24
"Bells of Capistrano" – 2:47
"Drinking Wine In Jarrow" – 1:27
"Black Haw" – 3:16
"Clé Elum" – 1:46
"Alone in the Dark Wood" – 4:35
"Nawne Ye" – 2:20
"Sheds Her Skin" – 3:47
"In the Hollow Mink Shoal" – 3:20
"Rattling the Calabash" – 4:09
"Birds Inspire Epic Bards" – 2:06
"Of Tubal Cain" – 2:23

Fursaxa albums
2007 albums